Brian Keith "Herbie" Flowers (born 19 May 1938) is an English musician specialising in electric bass, double bass and tuba. He is noted as a member of Blue Mink, T. Rex and Sky.

Flowers has contributed to recordings by Elton John (Tumbleweed Connection, Madman Across the Water), Camel (tuba on Nude), David Bowie (Space Oddity, Diamond Dogs), Lou Reed (Transformer, including the prominent bass line of "Walk on the Wild Side"), Melanie (Candles in the Rain),Roy Harper (Bullinamingvase), David Essex (Rock On), Al Kooper (New York City (You're a Woman)), Bryan Ferry (The Bride Stripped Bare), Harry Nilsson (Nilsson Schmilsson, Son of Schmilsson), Cat Stevens (New Masters, Foreigner),  Paul McCartney (Give My Regards to Broad Street), George Harrison (Somewhere in England, Gone Troppo, Brainwashed) and Ringo Starr (Stop and Smell the Roses). He also played bass on Jeff Wayne's Musical Version of The War of the Worlds.

By the end of the 1970s, Flowers had played bass on an estimated 500 hit recordings.

Life and career
Flowers was born in Isleworth, Middlesex, England. He began his musical training in 1956 when conscripted into the Royal Air Force, electing at first to serve for nine years as a bandsman playing tuba. He took up double bass as a second instrument to secure his "junior technician" stripe and later moved to electric bass. After completing his military service he passed through the line-ups of several Dixieland jazz bands in the early 1960s, then discovered modern jazz. In 1965 he was engaged as a bandsman on the ocean liner Queen Elizabeth. After hearing an electric bass at a New York nightclub, he acquired his own solid-body electric instrument, a Lake Placid Blue 1960 Fender Jazz Bass that he purchased from Manny's Music in New York City for $79.

Later in the 1960s, Flowers began to acquire his reputation as a session player, working for record producers such as Shel Talmy, Mickie Most, Steve Rowland, Richard Perry, Gus Dudgeon and Tony Visconti.

In 1969, Flowers was a founding member of the group Blue Mink, playing on their song "Melting Pot" which reached No. 3 in the UK Singles Chart, and early heavy rock band Rumplestiltskin. He was also a member of CCS and the final lineup of T. Rex, along with Dino Dines.

In 1979, shortly after taking part in the annual A Song For Europe contest, performing "Mr Moonlight" with his group, the Daisies, he became a co-founder of the band Sky which had success in the United Kingdom and Australia.

Flowers is also known for having composed the novelty hit "Grandad" for Clive Dunn in 1970. According to Flowers, he came up with it after following an easy primer book on composing. All he needed was a hook, and he was struggling to come up with anything. He telephoned a friend, Ken Pickett, who came round, ringing the doorbell, and the sound of the doorbell provided the hook he needed.

Perhaps Flowers' most famous bass line is the one he created for Lou Reed's "Walk on the Wild Side" from the album Transformer (1972), the only song by Reed to reach the Top 20 in the US.

He played and recorded with Marc Bolan from late 1976 until Bolan's death, in September 1977, and also appeared with him on the Marc television series in 1977.

Following Sky's demise in the early 1990s, Flowers has spent most of his time playing jazz. He has also worked as a bass guitar teacher at Ardingly College and leads many "Rockshops" at schools, helping young people to create and perform their own songs, as well as covering many others.

In 1998, session drummer Peter Boita again teamed up with Flowers to form a rhythm section in musical settings of the words of poet Sir John Betjeman on a second album they recorded together. The album was called Betjeman & Read. They had previously worked together on the Poetry in Motion album (released on Silhouette Records as MDKR 1), which also consisted of settings of Betjeman's It featuring Boita and Flowers playing with a line-up of artists that included David Essex, Justin Hayward, Steve Harley, Donovan, Alvin Stardust, Captain Sensible and Annie Haslam amongst others with Beatles' producer George Martin overseeing proceedings. Boita and Flowers reprised their roles when Poetry in Motion was performed live for a charity show at the Richmond Theatre on 5 April 1992. Betjeman & Read was one of the last albums recorded at the RG Jones Recording studio in Wimbledon. The vocal artists performing on this album include Cliff Richard, Marc Almond, Paul Young, Jon Anderson, Colin Blunstone, Gene Pitney, Leo Sayer, Donovan, Mike Read, the Rodolfus Choir and David Essex.

In September 2009 Flowers founded a community choir, Shoreham Singers-by-Sea, which has in excess of 150 members, followed, in September 2010, by the Ditchling Singers.

Solo discography

Albums
1975: Plant Life (Philips)
1980: A Little Potty (EMI)
1981: Herbie's Stuff (KPM)
2012: A Jazz Breakfast (HF15)

Singles
1970: Lincoln County (Polydor)
1973: Tramp / Flanker (Polydor)
1975: Mouth / Hi! It's Herbie Flowers (Philips)
1975: Dancing at Danny's / Mathematics (Philips)
1977: Jubilee / News (EMI)
1978: Don't Take My Bass Away / I Want to Be with You (EMI)
1979: Mr. Moonlight / I Want to Be with You (EMI)
1980: The Whale / Just for You (EMI)
1980: Burlington Bertie (Tramp) / Big George (EMI)
1981: Tuba Smarties / The Bathroom Song (Ariola)
1983: I Love 'er / Meet Me on The Corner (Magic)

Collaborations 
With Lou Reed
 Transformer (RCA Records, 1972)

With Harry Nilsson
 Nilsson Schmilsson (RCA Victor, 1971)

With Sam Brown
 43 Minutes (All At Once Records, 1993)
 Of the Moment (Pod Music, 2007)

With Bryan Ferry
 The Bride Stripped Bare (EG Records, 1978)

With Cat Stevens
 Foreigner (Island Records, 1973)

With Melanie
 Candles in the Rain (Buddah Records, 1970)

With Ringo Starr
 Stop and Smell the Roses (RCA Records, 1981)

With Petula Clark
 Destiny (CBS Records, 1978)

With Tim Rose
 Love – A Kind of Hate Story (Capitol Records, 1970)

With Roger Daltrey
 McVicar (Polydor Records, 1980)

With Olivia Newton-John
 If Not for You (Festival Records, 1971)

With Albert Hammond
 Al Otro Lado Del Sol (Epic Records, 1979)

With David Bowie
 David Bowie (Mercury Records, 1969)
 Diamond Dogs (RCA Records, 1974)
 David Live (RCA Records, 1974)

With Elton John
 Tumbleweed Connection (Uni, 1970)
 Madman Across the Water (Uni, 1971)
 A Single Man (Rocket, 1978)

With Jane Wiedlin
 Tangled (EMI, 1990)

With Steve Harley
 Hobo with a Grin (EMI, 1978)
 Poetic Justice (Transatlantic Records, 1996)

With David Essex
 Rock On (Columbia Records, 1973)
 David Essex (CBS Records, 1974)
 Imperial Wizard (Mercury Records, 1978)
 Silver Dream Racer (Mercury Records, 1980)
 Be-Bop the Future (Mercury Records, 1981)
 Stage - Struck (Mercury Records, 1982)
 This One's for You (Mercury Records, 1984)

With Cliff Richard 
 Rock 'n' Roll Juvenile (EMI, 1979)

With George Harrison
 Somewhere in England (Dark Horse Records, 1981)
 Gone Troppo (Dark Horse Records, 1982)
 Brainwashed (Dark Horse Records, 2002)

With Sally Oldfield
 Water Bearer (Bronze Records, 1978)
 Easy (Bronze Records, 1979)
 Celebration (Bronze Records, 1980)
 Playing in the Flame (Bronze Records, 1981)

With Al Kooper
 New York City (You're a Woman) (Columbia Records, 1971)
 A Possible Projection of the Future / Childhood's End (Columbia Records, 1972)

With T. Rex 
 Dandy in the Underworld (EMI, 1977)

References

External links

1938 births
Living people
People from Isleworth
English bass guitarists
English male guitarists
Male bass guitarists
English double-bassists
English tubists
English songwriters
Rock double-bassists
English session musicians
British jazz double-bassists
Male double-bassists
British male jazz musicians
Blue Mink members
English rock bass guitarists
CCS (band) members
T. Rex (band) members
Sky (English/Australian band) members
21st-century double-bassists
21st-century tubists
21st-century British male musicians
British male songwriters